The Courage of Others is the third studio album by American folk rock band Midlake. It was released on February 1, 2010, on Bella Union Records. The album sleeve pays homage to Andrei Rublev, a 1966 film by Russian writer and director Andrei Tarkovsky.

Reception

In 2014, drownedinsound.com called the album "a masterclass in crafted repose – repeated listens and time spent in its company yielding considerable reward". While Uncut was less impressed: "Midlake's secret is out: they're highly skilled dilettantes, attempting to master a different genre on each album just to give themselves a challenge. That's no crime in itself, and it beats making the same record over and over again, but it may explain the gaping hole at the heart of this strangely frigid album". And Tinymixtapes called it "the first great record of 2010, though one that admittedly requires a little adjusting... I’m not going to say that opener “Acts of Man” — with songwriter Tim Smith’s lyric “When all the newness of gold/ Travels far from where anyone’s been/ More like the earth/ Over years” lilting over plucked acoustic guitars and skittering snare — isn’t a little ridiculous; the kind of pompous, overblown rock poetry that punk was supposed to have killed. But I’ll argue that it serves as an appropriate disclaimer for the album: If you engage in the alien nomenclature — the way most of us have to when we listen to, say, Lil Wayne or Sun Ra — you’re in for an incredible listen."

Track listing
All songs written by Tim Smith.

Personnel
Midlake
Tim Smith – vocals, acoustic guitar, flute, recorder, piano, keyboards
Eric Pulido – guitars, dulcimer, autoharp, percussion, backing vocals
Paul Alexander – bass, electric guitar, bassoon
McKenzie Smith – drums, percussion
Eric Nichelson – guitars, autoharp, percussion

Other musicians
Max Townsley – electric guitar
Jesse Chandler – harpsichord
Fiona Brice – violin
Stephanie Dosen – harmony vocals on "Bring Down"

Charts

References

2010 albums
Midlake albums
Bella Union albums